Yui Chul Nam (Korean: 남의철, born July 16, 1981, Korean name is Nam Yui-Chul) is a South Korean mixed martial artist. He formerly competed in the UFC's lightweight division after fighting in the Korean promotion Road FC.

Mixed martial arts career

Background and early career
Nam began his professional mixed martial arts career in 2006, competing for many regional promotions (including M-1 Global, Legend Fighting Championship and ROAD FC) throughout Asia.  Nam was able to compile a record of 17-4-1 before signing with the UFC in December 2013.

Ultimate Fighting Championship
Nam made his promotional debut against Kazuki Tokudome on March 1, 2014 at The Ultimate Fighter: China Finale.  Nam won the bout via split decision.  Their performance earned both participants Fight of the Night honors.

Nam faced returning UFC veteran Phillipe Nover in a featherweight bout on May 16, 2015 at UFC Fight Night 66. He lost the fight via split decision.

Nam faced Mike De La Torre on November 28, 2015 at UFC Fight Night 79. He lost the fight via split decision and was subsequently released from the promotion.

Championships and accomplishments

Mixed martial arts
Spirit Martial Challenge
Spirit MC welterweight(-155 lb) title (one time)
ROAD Fighting Championship
ROAD FC lightweight title (one time)
ROAD FC lightweight tournament winner (2013)
Ultimate Fighting Championship
Fight of the Night (One time)

Mixed martial arts record

|-
|Win
|align=center|20–8–1
|Dong Guk Shin
|Decision (unanimous)
|Road FC 057
|
|align=center|3
|align=center|5:00
|Seoul, South Korea
|
|-
|Win
|align=center|19–8–1
|Doo Je Jung
|TKO (punches)
|Road FC 043
|
|align=center|1
|align=center|2:49
|Seoul, South Korea
|
|-
|Loss
|align=center|18–8–1
|Tom Santos
|KO (punches)
|Road FC 040
|
|align=center|1
|align=center|0:07
|Seoul, South Korea
|
|-
|Loss
|align=center|18–7–1
|Tom Santos
|TKO (punches)
|Road FC 038
|
|align=center|2
|align=center|2:30
|Seoul, South Korea
|
|-
|Loss
|align=center|18–6–1
|Mike De La Torre
|Decision (split)
|UFC Fight Night: Henderson vs. Masvidal
|
|align=center|3
|align=center|5:00
|Seoul, South Korea
|   
|-
| Loss
| align=center| 18–5–1
| Phillipe Nover
| Decision (split)
| UFC Fight Night: Edgar vs. Faber
| 
| align=center| 3
| align=center| 5:00
| Pasay, Philippines
| 
|-
| Win
| align=center| 18–4–1
| Kazuki Tokudome
| Decision (split)
| The Ultimate Fighter China Finale: Kim vs. Hathaway
| 
| align=center| 3
| align=center| 5:00
| Macau, SAR, China
| 
|-
| Win
| align=center| 17–4–1
| Takasuke Kume
| Decision (unanimous)
| Road FC 013
| 
| align=center| 3
| align=center| 5:00
| Gumi, South Korea
| 
|-
| Win
| align=center| 16–4–1
| Takasuke Kume
| Decision (unanimous)
| Road FC 011
| 
| align=center| 4
| align=center| 5:00
| Seoul, South Korea
| 
|-
| Win
| align=center| 15–4–1
| Vuyisile Colossa
| Decision (split)
| Road FC 010
| 
| align=center| 3
| align=center| 5:00
| Busan, South Korea
| 
|-
| Win
| align=center| 14–4–1
| Masahiro Toryu
| KO (punches)
| Road FC 009: Beatdown
| 
| align=center| 1
| align=center| 1:32
| Wonju, South Korea
| 
|-
| Loss
| align=center| 13–4–1
| Jadamba Narantungalag
| Submission (guillotine choke)
| Legend FC - Legend Fighting Championship 8
| 
| align=center| 2
| align=center| 0:58
| Hong Kong, SAR, China
| 
|-
| Win
| align=center| 13–3–1
| Vuyisile Colossa
| Decision (unanimous)
| Road FC 005: Night of Champions
| 
| align=center| 3
| align=center| 5:00
| Seoul, South Korea
| 
|-
| Win
| align=center| 12–3–1
| Tomoyoshi Iwamiya
| Decision (unanimous)
| Road FC 004: Young Guns
| 
| align=center| 3
| align=center| 5:00
| Seoul, South Korea
| 
|-
| Win
| align=center| 11–3–1
| Rob Hill
| TKO (punches)
| Legend FC - Legend Fighting Championship 5
| 
| align=center| 2
| align=center| 1:12
| Macau, SAR, China
| 
|-
| Loss
| align=center| 10–3–1
| Adrian Pang
| Decision (split)
| Legend FC - Legend Fighting Championship 4
| 
| align=center| 3
| align=center| 5:00
| Hong Kong, SAR, China
| 
|-
| Win
| align=center| 10–2–1
| Kota Okazawa
| KO (punch)
| Road FC 001: The Resurrection of Champions
| 
| align=center| 1
| align=center| 4:00
| Seoul, South Korea
| 
|-
| Draw
| align=center| 9–2–1
| Adrian Pang
| Draw
| Legend FC - Legend Fighting Championship 1
| 
| align=center| 3
| align=center| 5:00
| Hong Kong, SAR, China
| 
|-
| Win
| align=center| 9–2
| Hacran Dias
| Decision (unanimous)
| M-1 Challenge 17: Korea
| 
| align=center| 3
| align=center| 5:00
| Seoul, South Korea
| 
|-
| Loss
| align=center| 8–2
| Dave Jansen
| Decision (unanimous)
| M-1 Challenge 14: Japan
| 
| align=center| 2
| align=center| 5:00
| Tokyo, Japan
| 
|-
| Loss
| align=center| 8–1
| Mikhail Malyutin
| Decision (majority)
| M-1 Challenge 9: Russia
| 
| align=center| 2
| align=center| 5:00
| Saint Petersburg, Russia
| 
|-
| Win
| align=center| 8–0
| Se Young Kim
| TKO (punches)
| Spirit MC 18 - The Champion
| 
| align=center| 1
| align=center| 0:52
| Seoul, South Korea
| 
|-
| Win
| align=center| 7–0
| Woo Sung Yu
| TKO (punches)
| Spirit MC 10 - Welterweight GP Final
| 
| align=center| 2
| align=center| 0:22
| Seoul, South Korea
| 
|-
| Win
| align=center| 6–0
| Haeng Ki Kim
| Submission (rear-naked choke)
| Spirit MC 10 - Welterweight GP Final
| 
| align=center| 2
| align=center| 1:55
| Seoul, South Korea
| 
|-
| Win
| align=center| 5–0
| Yeong Gwang Choi
| Decision (majority)
| Spirit MC 9 - Welterweight GP Opening
| 
| align=center| 3
| align=center| 5:00
| Seoul, South Korea
| 
|-
| Win
| align=center| 4–0
| Chung-Il Jeon
| Decision (unanimous)
| Spirit MC 8 - Only One
| 
| align=center| 3
| align=center| 5:00
| Seoul, South Korea
| 
|-
| Win
| align=center| 3–0
| Yeong Gwang Choi
| TKO (punches)
| Spirit MC 8 - Only One
| 
| align=center| 1
| align=center| 0:23
| Seoul, South Korea
| 
|-
| Win
| align=center| 2–0
| Duk Young Jang
| TKO (punches)
| Spirit MC - Interleague 3
| 
| align=center| 1
| align=center| 1:33
| Seoul, South Korea
| 
|-
| Win
| align=center| 1–0
| Seong Yeop Jun
| KO (punch)
| Spirit MC - Interleague 3
| 
| align=center| 1
| align=center| 2:32
| Seoul, South Korea
|

See also
 List of current UFC fighters
 List of male mixed martial artists

References

External links
Official UFC Profile

1981 births
Living people
Sportspeople from Seoul
South Korean male mixed martial artists
Lightweight mixed martial artists
Mixed martial artists utilizing taekwondo
Mixed martial artists utilizing judo
Mixed martial artists utilizing Brazilian jiu-jitsu
Road Fighting Championship champions
Ultimate Fighting Championship male fighters
South Korean male taekwondo practitioners
South Korean practitioners of Brazilian jiu-jitsu
People awarded a black belt in Brazilian jiu-jitsu
South Korean male judoka
21st-century South Korean people